Elbe-Havel-Land is a Verbandsgemeinde ("collective municipality") in the district of Stendal, in Saxony-Anhalt, Germany. Until 1 January 2010, it was a Verwaltungsgemeinschaft. It is situated on the right bank of the Elbe, south of Havelberg. The seat of the Verbandsgemeinde is in Schönhausen.

The Verbandsgemeinde Elbe-Havel-Land consists of the following municipalities:

Kamern 
Klietz 
Sandau
Schönhausen
Schollene 
Wust-Fischbeck

References

External links
www.elbe-havel-land.de

Verbandsgemeinden in Saxony-Anhalt